Counterspy Meets Scotland Yard is a 1950 American film noir B movie directed by Seymour Friedman and starring Howard St. John, Ron Randell and Amanda Blake.

Plot

When enemy agents obtain leaked secrets about a guided missile system, an American spy and a British investigator are teamed together to find the source.

Cast
Howard St. John as David Harding
Amanda Blake as Karen Michele
Ron Randell as Simon Langton
June Vincent as Barbara Taylor
Fred Sears as Peters
John Dehner as Robert Reynolds
Lewis Martin as Dr. Victor Gilbert, also known as Hugo Boren
Rick Vallin as McCullough
Jimmy Lloyd as Burton
Ted Jordan as Brown
Gregory Gay as Professor Schuman
Douglas Evans as Colonel Kilgore
John Doucette as Larry, a thug
Don Brodie as Jimmy, a thug

References

External links

Counterspy Meets Scotland Yard at TCMDB
Review of film at Variety

1950 films
1950 crime drama films
American crime drama films
Columbia Pictures films
Films directed by Seymour Friedman
Films based on radio series
American black-and-white films
1950s English-language films
1950s American films